Wren Academy is a mixed all-through school (plus sixth form) located in North Finchley, London, England.

It was opened in 2008. In 2015 Wren Academy opened a primary school phase. The school also has an in-house chapel.

All Through Academy

Wren Academy is an all-through academy school, including Sixth form, meaning that it has pupils and students from Reception through to Year 13. Starting in 2008 with 6 forms of 180 Year 7 students the Academy grew each year with additional year groups added. The Sixth Form opened in 2013 with a two form Primary school phase starting in 2015. The school has 1640 pupils and students.

It is a mixed sex comprehensive school, where pupils are taught in single sex classes in core subjects (Maths, English and Science), and top-set Physical Education classes.

The school is sponsored by London Diocesan Board for Schools and a broadly Christian ethos guided from the Church of England.  It is co-sponsored by Berkhamsted School.

The Academy is an associate member of the Woodard group of schools.

Ofsted Inspections
 
Since opening in 2008 Wren Academy has received three Outstanding Ofsted reports. The latest in 2018 covered the Primary and Secondary phases rating the school outstanding in every category.

Adam Justice-Mills, convicted of 78 counts of child sexual offences in Barnet and Haringey between 2000 and 2020, was a cover supervisor at the school from September 2010 to July 2014.

References

External links
Wren Academy official website

Academies in the London Borough of Barnet
Secondary schools in the London Borough of Barnet
Church of England secondary schools in the Diocese of London
Educational institutions established in 2008
2008 establishments in England
Woodard Schools
Primary schools in the London Borough of Barnet